2007 Magny-Cours GP2 Series round was a GP2 Series motor race held on June 30 and July 1, 2007, at the Circuit de Nevers Magny-Cours in Magny-Cours, France. It was the fourth race of the 2007 GP2 Series season. The race was used to support the 2007 French Grand Prix.

Classification

Qualifying

Feature race

Sprint race

References

Magny-Cours Gp2 Round, 2007
Magny-Cours
Magny-Cours Gp2 Round
Magny-Cours Gp2 Round